The Cartuja 93 park is a technological and scientific complex located in Seville, in the Isla de la Cartuja, next to the Monastery of Santa Maria de las Cuevas. It started in 1993 to exploit the showground and buildings inherited from the 1992 Universal Exposition Seville Expo '92.

Cartuja 93 integrates five different development fields: Advanced Technology Enterprises, Public Services of R&D, Scientific Research Centers, Technology Centers, and technical, business and University colleges.

Nowadays, Cartuja´93 is one of the most important technological and scientific parks of south Europe: during 2009 it invoiced 2,194 millions of euros, and employed 14,380 people.

Representative entities and enterprises

SHS Consultores
MP Corporación
Inerco
Grupo Tecnológica
Sadiel
Sodean
Isotrol
Ayesa
Detea
IAT
Egmasa

Research centers and institutions

Centro de Investigaciones Científicas Isla de la Cartuja cicCartuja 
Estación Biológica de Doñana (Doñana Biological Station).
Centro Andaluz de Biología Molecular y Medicina Regenerativa (Andalusian Center of Molecular Biology and Regenerative Medicine).
Centro Nacional de Aceleradores.
Instituto de Prospectiva Tecnológica de la UE.
Centro de Tecnologías del Agua.
Fundación Progreso y Salud.
Instituto de Microelectrónica de Sevilla

Schools

Escuela Técnica Superior de Ingenieros de la Universidad de Sevilla (High School of Engineering of Seville). (Ingenierías Industriales, Química, Aeronáutica y Telecomunicaciones)
 Facultad de Comunicación de la Universidad de Sevilla (Communication Sciences Faculty)
 Universidad Internacional de Andalucía (International University of Andalusia)
 Escuela de Organización Industrial de Andalucía.
 ESIC
 CEADE.
 Universitat Oberta de Catalunya

Others
Confederación de Empresarios de Andalucía CEA

External links
 Cartuja 93

References

Buildings and structures in Seville
Seville Expo '92
World's fair sites in Seville
Industrial parks in Spain